Sidakeni Ward is ward number 7 of the 33 wards
in Zibagwe Rural District Council of Kwekwe District. It is in Zhombe
Communinal
Land in Midlands Province of Zimbabwe. It is 92 km north-west-north of Kwekwe and 64 km south-west of Kadoma.

Municipality 
The Zibagwe Rural District Council runs the ward and at present the ward is represented by a male councillor, on a ZANU-PF ticket.

Shopping Centers

  Sidakeni Township
 Mangwarangwara Township (kwaChiroro)
 St Peter's Munyati Township (kwaHove)
 Kasawe Township (Kasawi).

Schools

Primary

 Sidakeni Primary School established 1966
 Kasawe Primary School  established 1965
 Mangwarangwara Primary School established 1965
 St Peters Munyati Primary School established 1963.

Secondary

 Sidakeni Secondary School established 1981
 Kasawe Secondary School established 2008.

Health Center

Sidakeni Clinic is the only health center in Sidakeni Ward. It is staffed by 2 qualified nurse and 2 nurse aides, and it has 2 general beds. It is owned by Zivagwe Rural District Council.

Animal Health Center

There is an animal health care center here that serves wards 6, 7 and 8.

Alumni

 Somandla Ndebele was born and bred in Sidakeni Village, and he also was educated at Sidakeni Secondary School.

References

Wards of Zimbabwe